Jonathan Adam Saunders Baruchel (born April 9, 1982) is a Canadian actor, comedian, director and screenwriter. He is known for his voice role as Hiccup Haddock in the How to Train Your Dragon franchise, and for his roles in comedy movies such as Knocked Up, Tropic Thunder, The Trotsky, Fanboys, She's Out of My League, Goon, This Is the End, and the action-fantasy film The Sorcerer's Apprentice. He had lead roles as Josh Greenberg in the FXX comedy television series Man Seeking Woman and Steven Karp in Judd Apatow's comedy series Undeclared.

Early life
Baruchel was born in Ottawa, Ontario, the son of Robyne (née Ropell), a freelance writer, and Serge Baruchel, an antiques dealer. He grew up in the Notre-Dame-de-Grâce neighbourhood of Montréal, Quebec, and has a younger sister. His father was born in Paris, France. Baruchel is of one-quarter Sephardi Jewish descent, with the rest of his ancestry being French and Irish-Catholic. He has stated that he believes his Irish roots are from County Mayo.

Career

Baruchel got his first acting job when he was just 12. One of his first major acting roles was on the local television series My Hometown in 1996. From 1997 to 1998, he co-hosted Popular Mechanics for Kids with Elisha Cuthbert. After appearing briefly in Cameron Crowe's Oscar winning film Almost Famous, Baruchel won the role of Steven Karp on Judd Apatow's acclaimed yet short-lived television series Undeclared, where he starred alongside Seth Rogen, Carla Gallo, Charlie Hunnam, and Monica Keena. He then appeared with James Van Der Beek in Roger Avary's The Rules of Attraction.

In 2004, Baruchel played boxing hopeful Danger Barch in Clint Eastwood's Million Dollar Baby. Baruchel then starred in Nemesis Game and Fetching Cody, before appearing opposite Don Johnson on the WB's Just Legal in 2005, and guest-starring on the CBS drama Numb3rs in 2006.

Baruchel appeared in the films Knocked Up (which reunited him with Judd Apatow, Jason Segel, and Seth Rogen), I'm Reed Fish, Just Buried, and the Ben Stiller-directed Tropic Thunder, alongside Jack Black, Nick Nolte, Steve Coogan, and Robert Downey Jr. He co-starred with Seth Rogen in the 2007 trailer for Jay and Seth versus the Apocalypse, created by Rogen and Evan Goldberg as a strategy to garner interest and funding for a similar, larger-scale project (later made in 2013 as This Is the End). In 2008, he appeared in Nick and Norah's Infinite Playlist. He also made a brief appearance in Night at the Museum 2: Battle of the Smithsonian.

In 2010, Baruchel starred in the films The Trotsky, DreamWorks' She's Out of My League (opposite Alice Eve), and the live-action Disney adaptation of The Sorcerer's Apprentice. He also voiced the starring role in the acclaimed animated feature, How to Train Your Dragon, a role he has subsequently continued throughout the franchise, including its television series. Also in 2010, he played two supporting characters in the Canadian comedy series The Drunk and On Drugs Happy Fun Time Hour. He developed the screenplay for Goon, with Evan Goldberg, playing Johnny Klutz, a character of his own creation. Goon co-stars Seann William Scott and fellow Canadian actor Eugene Levy.

Baruchel also appeared in the 2010 Adidas Originals ad campaign, "Cantina", in conjunction with the FIFA World Cup and in video clips for Canadian prog-rockers Rush's 2012–13 Clockwork Angels tour.

In July 2012, he appeared in the music video for the song "Toxsik Waltz" by rapper Necro. In the summer of 2013, he starred in the hit apocalyptic comedy This Is the End and in 2014, he appeared in the RoboCop remake and reprised his role as Hiccup in How to Train Your Dragon 2.

In July 2014, it was announced that Baruchel would be starring in the FXX comedy Man Seeking Woman which premiered in January 2015. He also appeared in the 2015 music video for the song "Every Little Means Trust" by Idlewild.

Baruchel was also involved in writing the Chapterhouse comic book series Captain Canuck.

Baruchel wrote, directed, and starred in the 2017 sports comedy film Goon: Last of the Enforcers, the sequel to the 2011 film Goon.

In 2018, he made his debut as an author, with Born Into It: A Fan's Life, released on Harper Collins. The book explored his love of the Montreal Canadiens with anecdotes, childhood memories, and heartfelt tales about his life as a fan of the team.

After the release of How to Train Your Dragon: The Hidden World, 2019 saw Baruchel star in the Danish film The Kindness of Strangers and the Canadian horror film Random Acts of Violence, which was his second film as a director.

In 2021, Baruchel hosted the original audio podcast documentary series for Audible.ca, Highly Legal, that explored the political and economic history and aftermath of Canada's legalization of marijuana. In the same year, Baruchel and his wife, Rebecca-Jo Dunham, both appeared in the music video for "Ouch", the lead single from The Tragically Hip's archival EP Saskadelphia. He was also named host of LOL: Last One Laughing Canada, which premiered on February 18, 2022 on Amazon Prime Video. He appears in the seventh episode of The Kids in the Hall revival.

In 2022, Baruchel hosted the Crave original series We're All Gonna Die (Even Jay Baruchel), a six-episode docuseries about the end of the world that explored potential world-ending risks. Baruchel, as host, met with scientists and other experts to discuss the feasibility of the risks and the potential solutions and innovations to counter the issues.

Personal life
Baruchel was engaged to actress Alison Pill from 2011 to 2013. He alluded to their break-up in a Twitter post on February 16, 2013. In May 2018, Baruchel announced his engagement to his girlfriend Rebecca-Jo Dunham. They were married on September 21, 2019, in Portugal. Baruchel has said that he is "probably agnostic".

Baruchel has several tattoos: a Celtic cross (on his upper right arm) to honour his Irish heritage, and a red Maple Leaf on his left pectoral, which can be seen in Fanboys, Knocked Up, Tropic Thunder, and This Is the End.

Baruchel is a supporter of Scottish football club Celtic since the early 2000s, and in 2016 co-produced a documentary detailing his journey towards falling in love with the club.

Filmography

Film

Television

Music videos

Awards and nominations

References

External links

1982 births
20th-century Canadian male actors
21st-century Canadian male actors
Anglophone Quebec people
Annie Award winners
Canadian agnostics
Canadian Comedy Award winners
Canadian expatriate male actors in the United States
Canadian male child actors
Canadian male comedians
Canadian male film actors
Canadian male screenwriters
Canadian male television actors
Canadian male voice actors
Canadian people of French descent
Canadian people of Irish descent
Canadian people of Jewish descent
Canadian Screen Award winners
Canadian stand-up comedians
Comedians from Montreal
Comedians from Ontario
Daytime Emmy Award winners
Film directors from Montreal
Film directors from Ottawa
Living people
Male actors from Montreal
Male actors from Ottawa
People from Côte-des-Neiges–Notre-Dame-de-Grâce